Yale Corinthian Yacht Club is a public sailing facility located on Short Beach in Branford, Connecticut (United States), home of the Yale University sailing team. It is generally abbreviated as "YCYC" and is affectionately pronounced "yic-yic."

Founded in 1881, it is the oldest collegiate sailing club in the world. YCYC is about six miles from campus.

Student officers, such as the commodore, secretary, and fleet captain, run the club. They manage everything from the facilities and fleet to fund-raising and hosting events,

Summer Program
The yacht club hosts a summer program annually for youth and adults in the interest of teaching novices to sail and race while partially funding the college team's racing activity.

References

External links
 
 

1881 establishments in Connecticut
1987 America's Cup
Buildings and structures in Branford, Connecticut
Long Island Sound
Sailing in Connecticut
Sports clubs established in 1881
Yacht clubs in the United States
Yale Bulldogs sailing
Sports venues completed in 1881
College sailing venues in the United States